Mădălin is a Romanian male given name that may refer to:
 Mădălin Ciucă (born 1982), Romanian footballer
 Mădălin Lemnaru (born 1989), Romanian rugby union player
 Mădălin Marius Popa (born 1982), Romanian footballer and manager
 Mădălin Martin (born 1992), Romanian footballer
 Mădălin Mihăescu (born 1988), Romanian footballer
 Mădălin Murgan (born 1983), Romanian football player
 Mădălin Popa (born 1983), Romanian footballer
 Mădălin Răileanu (born 1997), Romanian footballer
 Mădălin Smaranda (born 1984), Romanian footballer
 Mădălin Staicu (born 1990), Romanian footballer
 Mădălin Stancu (born 1992), Romanian footballer
 Mădălin Voicu (born 1952), Romanian musician and politician

Romanian masculine given names